A New Dimension of Might is the third studio album by the band Trail of Tears. The bonus track is a cover of the song "Caffeine" by the band Faith No More, from their album Angel Dust.

Track listing

Bonus track

Personnel
 Ronny Thorsen – vocals
 Cathrine Paulsen – female vocals
 Runar Hansen – lead guitars
 Terje Heiseldal – guitars
 Kjell Rune Hagen – bass guitar
 Frank Roald Hagen – synthesizers
 Jonathan Pérez – drums
 Peter MacMahon - Sound engineer and Might Specialist

Additional musicians
 Kjetil Nordhus – vocals
 Damien Surian and Hubert Piazzola – choirs

References

Trail of Tears (band) albums
2002 albums
Napalm Records albums